Arieh Batun-Kleinstub (also "-Naveh"; אריה קלינשטוב-נווה; born 26 January 1933) is an Israeli former Olympic high jumper.

High jump career

He competed for Israel at the 1952 Summer Olympics in Helsinki, at the age of 19.  He came in 35th in the Men's High Jump with a jump of 1.70 metres.

His personal best in the high jump was 1.88 metres in 1953.

He competed for Israel and won gold medals in both the 1953 Maccabiah Games and the 1957 Maccabiah Games in the high jump.

References 

Living people
Athletes (track and field) at the 1952 Summer Olympics
1933 births
Israeli male high jumpers
Olympic athletes of Israel
Maccabiah Games gold medalists for Israel
Jewish male athletes (track and field)
Maccabiah Games medalists in athletics
Competitors at the 1953 Maccabiah Games
Competitors at the 1957 Maccabiah Games